Line 1 of the Beijing Subway is the oldest and one of the busiest lines of Beijing's mass transit rail network.  Line 1 runs underneath Chang'an Avenue, the city's grand east–west thoroughfare, right through the heart of Beijing with stops on either side of Tiananmen Square. Line 1's color is red. Through operation with the Batong line started on August 29, 2021.

Ridership
As the oldest line of the Beijing Subway, Line 1 was also the most heavily used from the time the subway opened in 1971 until January 2013, when the near-completion of the Line 10 loop caused ridership on that line to surge past Line 1. Recent traffic relief efforts have been completed in recent years. The opening of the first phase of the parallel Line 6, caused an 8.46% decrease in daily demand and a 10-20% reduction in peak flow during rush hour. In addition Beijing BRT line 2 parallels the eastern section of Line 1. In the meantime between 2014 and 2015, Line 1 again upgraded its signals to a communications-based train control system allowing trains to run at headways as low as 1 minutes 45 seconds. However, during peak hours, sections of the line were reported in 2013 to still operate above 100% capacity.

Hours of operation
The first east-bound trains departs from Gucheng at 4:58am and Pingguoyuan at 5:10am.  The first west-bound train departs Sihui at 4:56am and Sihui East at 5:05am. The last east-bound train leaves Pingguoyuan at 10:55pm.  The last west-bound train leaves Sihui East at 11:15pm.

Route
The line heads southeast to its second stop at Gucheng and from there runs straight east, following Chang'an Avenue all the way to its eastern terminus,  in Chaoyang District, just beyond the 4th Ring Road. The line passes through Xidan, Wangfujing and Dongdan, among other important commercial centers of Xicheng and Dongcheng Districts, as well as the Beijing CBD near the China World Trade Center.

Stations
Station list for Line 1 and Batong line of Beijing Subway, after the through operation started on August 29, 2021.

History

The first section of subway in Beijing officially started trial operation on January 15, 1971. The line was transferred to the newly created Beijing Mass Transit Operation Corporation and was officially opened to the public, ending the decade long trial operation period. By 1981, the annual passenger volume of Beijing Subway was 64.66 million passengers, with a daily average of 177,000 passenger trips.

On August 15, 1986, the second phase of subway construction started and a feasibility study on the construction of the new line between of Fuxingmen to Bawangfen (Today's Beijing CBD) was carried out. In January 1991, the feasibility study report on the construction of a new line between Fuxingmen to Bawangfen was approved with construction of the new "Fuba line", starting in June 1992. In 1994, Line 1's signals were upgraded to automatic train protection system.

Headway Reduction 
Since 2014, the signaling and power systems has been gradually upgraded to allow for trains to run more frequently. The upgraded CBTC moving block signaling system in place today reduces rush hour headways from every 2 minutes and 5 seconds to 1 minute 45 seconds.

Platform screen doors

Due to platform congestion and suicides, a proposal was made in 2010 to refit all stations on Line 1 with platform screen doors. However, the ventilation system in the older stations of Line 1 was incompatible with full-height platform screen doors, so half height platform screen doors were chosen instead.  In July 2016, the operator began installing platform screen doors on Line 1. In 2016, the platform screen doors was installed at Yong'anli station. By the end of 2017, all stations except  were retrofitted with half-height platform screen doors, and all the screen doors were put into operation for the first time.

Through operations with the Batong line

However, the Beijing Subway responded that Line 1's and Batong's signal systems are completely different, so through-operation will be more difficult to achieve, from an engineering standpoint. As of 2016, preliminary design and feasibility studies are underway to allow for through operations between Line 1 and Batong. On June 12, 2020, the project of the through operation of Line 1 and Batong line was approved by Beijing Development and Reform Commission. Through operation with the Batong line started on 29 August 2021.

Other facilities

Restricted stations

Beyond , Line 1 extends further northwest where it has several other stations: Gaojing and Fushouling. Gaojing station is in the military region. Fushouling station is actually outside the military region. These stations are not open for public use.

Fushouling station will open to public in 2023.

A proposal to open the Gaojing station to public is mentioned within 2022 and 2023 working plan of the Shijingshan District.

Future Development

Increasing capacity

Due to Line 1's severe overcapacity problem, there are plans to introduce 7-car or longer trains. According to an interview to the director of Beijing Municipal Transport Commission in December 2022, they will introduce 7-car trains in the eastern section of Line 1 and the Batong line in future.

Branch to Qinglonghudong
In 8 July 2022, an EIA document regarding Phase III construction of Beijing rail transport system (2022–2027) mentions a proposal about the branch line of Line 1. The branch line is a southwest-to-northeast line starts from Qinglonghudong (located at the east side of Qinglong Lake, in Wangzuo, Fengtai District) to Bajiao Amusement Park in Shijingshan District. It will be  in length with 9 new stations.

Rolling Stock

Current

Former

See also

 Restricted stations of Line 1, Beijing Subway

Notes

References

Beijing Subway lines
Railway lines opened in 1971
1971 establishments in China
750 V DC railway electrification